The 2013 season was Davy Fitzgerald's second year as manager of the Clare senior hurling team. Clare went on to win their fourth All-Ireland Senior Hurling Championship after a 5-16 to 3-16 win against Cork in the final on 28 September.

2013 squad
Manager: Davy Fitzgerald
Selectors: Mike Deegan, Louis Mulqueen
Strength and Conditioning Coach: Joe O'Connor
Trainer: Paul Kinnerk
Physios: Diarmuid Horgan, Mary O'Keeffe
Medical: Dr. Padraic Quinn M.D.
Team Manager: Seoirse Bulfin
Backroom Team: Aimee McInerney, Tom Stackpool, Padraig McMahon, Seanie McMahon, Tommy Hegarty, John O' Sullivan, Fergie McDonagh

2013 Waterford Crystal Cup
Clare faced defending champions Tipperary in the final under lights in Thurles on 9 February, with Clare winning by 1-21 to 1-13.

2013 National Hurling League
On 14 April, Clare defeated Cork by two points after extra-time in the League Division 1A relegation playoff to retain their league status in division 1.

Speaking after the game manager Davy Fitzgerald said "It’s a good win, we beat Cork in a relegation play-off – that’s it, we’re not going to get carried away by it, we won’t beat the likes of Waterford with so many wides. Cork could just as easily have won that game, we know there’s still a long road to go."

Results

Division 1A

2013 Munster Senior Hurling Championship

2013 All-Ireland Senior Hurling Championship

All-Ireland Final Drawn Game
Clare got the opening score of the third minute with a point from Darach Honan. and were ahead by 012 to 0-10 at half time. After 40 minutes Conor Lehane scored the opening goal of the same with a shot past the goalkeeper from the right and into the net to make the score 1-10 to 0-14. Cork got a second goal in the 57th minute when goalkeeper Anthony Nash hit a 20-yard free to the net after Luke O'Farrell had been fouled. With seven minutes left on the clock, Cork captain Patrick Cronin hit a shot to the top left corner of the net to level the game.
Patrick Horgan looked to have won it for Cork with a point in the last minute.
Added on time of two minutes was already up when Clare right-back Domhnall O'Donovan received the ball out on the left before hitting the ball over the bar just as he was tacked to tie up the match.
The referee blew the final whistle after 2 minutes and 38 seconds to bring the match to a replay three weeks later.

All-Ireland Final Replay
John Conlon got the opening score of the game, a point in the second minute. A hat-trick of goals in the 6th, 14th and 19th minutes at the hill 16 end from late call-up Shane O'Donnell put Clare on the way to a four-point lead of 3-9 to 1-11 at half time. Anthony Nash had blasted a 20-metre free past 12 Clare players on the line for a goal that brought Cork back to within three points in the 16th minute.
Clare then led by eight points but Cork had drawn level, 1-16 to 3-10, by the 52nd minute. With 18 minutes left the scores were level at 1-16 to 3-10 and they were level again with ten minutes left when Séamus Harnedy scored with a low shot to the net to make the score 2-16 to 3-13.
In the 61st minute, Clare's Conor McGrath ran at goals and fired the ball high to the left corner of the net for Clare's fourth goal. Darach Honan, who came on as a second-half substitute got Clare's fifth goal in the 71st minute after he received the ball on the right and managed to get as far as the Cork goals before pushing the ball past the goalkeeper with the ball rolling over the line.

Awards
The nominations for the 2013 GAA-GPA Hurling All-Stars were announced on 2 October with Clare receiving thirteen nominations.
Cian Dillon and Patrick O’Connor were the only Clare players not nominated.
The final team selection was made on 6 November before the team being presented with their awards two days later at a banquet at Croke Park.
Clare's won eight places on the All-Stars team with David McInerney, Brendan Bugler, Pat Donnellan, Colm Galvin, Conor Ryan, Tony Kelly, Pádraic Collins and Conor McGrath all winning awards.

Clare had two of the three nominations for the GPA Hurler of the Year, Tony Kelly and Pádraic Collins of Clare. All three nominations for the GPA Young Hurler of the Year were from Clare, Tony Kelly, Pádraic Collins, and David McInerney from Clare.

Tony Kelly was named Young Hurler of the Year and Hurler of the Year for 2013 at the All Stars award ceremony on 8 November at Croke Park.

DVD release
On 29 November, a behind-the-scenes documentary on the Clare hurling team during 2013 called Behind the Banner was released.

Team holiday
An 80-strong party of Clare hurlers, their partners and officials flew out in early January 2014 for a 10-day end of year holiday taking in Boston, Cancun in Mexico and New York.

References

External links
Clare GAA Official Site
Clare GAA on Hogan Stand

Clare
Clare county hurling team seasons